John Arthur Root, known professionally as Jack Root (May 26, 1875 – June 10, 1963) was an American boxer. He was the first world light heavyweight champion as well as a challenger for the world heavyweight title. He fought out of Chicago. He was elected into the International Boxing Hall of Fame in 2011.

Family
His uncle, Janos Rutt, immigrated to Minnesota. Today,  some of his descendants in and around south-central Minnesota evolved the spelling of their last name to Rutt. There is a descendant based in the Chicago area who was Adopted and had 2 sons, Their family has relocated around the United States to Arizona, California, Indiana, and Northern Michigan. They all have distinct physical resemblances, His grandsons were mentioned and awarded in his will. A great-great-grandson, Travis Rutt, is a wrestler from New Prague, MN.

Championship Claim
Root (with the support of some historians) claimed that he was the first world light heavyweight champion. His bout with George Gardiner on July 4, 1903, is claimed by some to be the first title bout in the new division. Root contended that his manager, Lou Housman, created the division and billed the Root vs. Gardner fight, which Gardner won by knockout in the twelfth round. The fight was caught on film. Jack Root, George Gardner, and Bob Fitzsimmons all held the light heavyweight world championship title in 1903.

During the 1980s, however, some boxing historians found records indicating that Joe Choynski won a twenty-round decision over Jimmy Ryan on August 18, 1899, in a fight billed as being for the light heavyweight championship. Choynski never seems to have made any claim to be the first light heavyweight champion, however.

Heavyweight title fight
On July 3, 1905, Root fought Marvin Hart for the vacant world heavyweight championship in Reno Nevada. The former champion, Jim Jeffries, had retired and declared that Hart and Root were the two top heavyweights. Jeffries refereed the fight to name the new champion, which Hart won by a twelfth-round knockout.

After boxing
Root served as a lieutenant in the U.S. Army during World War I. After his time in the service Root became the president and boxing manager of the renowned Los Angeles Olympic Auditorium. Root was also one of many boxers to attend the funeral of Feab S. Williams (better known as "George Godfrey").

Death
Root died on June 10, 1963 at Temple Hospital from a heart attack, aged 87.

Professional boxing record

See also
List of light heavyweight boxing champions

References

|-

External links

1875 births
1963 deaths
Austro-Hungarian emigrants to the United States
People from Jindřichův Hradec District
American people of Austrian descent
Light-heavyweight boxers
World boxing champions
Boxers from Illinois
American male boxers